There is recognition for the United States Champion Jockey by earnings but no formal award is given to the jockey whose mounts earned the most purse money in American Thoroughbred racing.

Most years won
Bill Shoemaker (10)
Laffit Pincay Jr. (7)
Eddie Arcaro, Jerry Bailey (6)

References

See also
 United States Champion Jockey by wins

American jockeys
Horse racing in the United States